Trevose Head (meaning farm of the wall's headland) is a headland on the Atlantic coast of north Cornwall, United Kingdom. The South West Coast Path runs around the whole promontory and is within the Cornwall Area of Outstanding Natural Beauty and the Trevose Head Heritage Coast. In clear weather, visitors to Trevose Head can see virtually the whole length of the north Cornwall coast; to the north, the view extends beyond the Cornwall county boundary to Hartland Point, Devon; to the south, it extends beyond St Ives to the headland at Pendeen Watch.

LB&SCR H2 class 4-4-2 no. 425 (later no. B425, 2425, and 32425) was named Trevose Head after this landmark.

History
The ruins of St Constantine's chapel can be visited at hole 3 of Trevose Golf Club along an ancient right of way. The club is situated between Constantine Bay and Mother Ivey's Bay, behind Booby's Bay.

Trevose Head Lighthouse, maintained by Trinity House, is on the north-west corner of the headland and the Padstow lifeboat is stationed on the east side of Trevose Head. The lighthouse was first lit on 1 December 1847; initially there was an upper and lower light with the lower light no longer used after 1882. The last of the resident keepers left the lighthouse on 20 December 1995 following automation. A lifeboat was established at Padstow before 1825 and in 1967 the lifeboat station was moved from Hawkers Cove to Trevose Head due to silting of the River Camel. The present station was completed in July 2006 and came into service shortly after.

In September 1940, during World War 2, there is a record of bombs being dropped on Trevose Head, although it is suspected that these were jettisoned rather than the headland being deliberately targeted.

The area had been in the ownership of the same family since circa 1900.

Natural history
The headland is within the Trevose Head and Constantine Bay Site of Special Scientific Interest (SSSI) which is designated for both its biological and geological interests. Wild asparagus (Asparagus prostratus) grows on the cliffs of Dinas Head and shore dock (Rumex rupestris) at the base of the cliffs. The cliffs are also important for breeding northern fulmar (Fulmarus glacialis), razorbill (Alca torda) and guillemot (Uria aalge).

References

External links

 Trinity House information on Trevose Lighthouse
 Padstow Lifeboat Station

Headlands of Cornwall
Sites of Special Scientific Interest in Cornwall
Sites of Special Scientific Interest notified in 1951